The 2021–22 season is the 72nd season of competitive association football played by Dynamo Dresden, a professional football club who play their home matches at the Rudolf-Harbig-Stadion in Dresden, Saxony, Germany. Having achieved promotion from the 3. Liga during the 2020–21 season, this season marks their return to the 2. Bundesliga after having been relegated in 2020.

Background
Following their relegation to the 3. Liga, Dynamo Dresden successfully rebuilt their squad and gained immediate re-promotion to the 2. Bundesliga, winning the league ahead of FC Hansa Rostock and FC Ingolstadt 04. Alexander Schmidt retains his role as manager from the previous season, having signed a new two-year contract after managing the team for the last five games of the previous season. The 2021–22 2. Bundesliga season began on 23 July 2021.

Season summary

Players

First-team squad

Left club during season

Transfers

Transfers in

Loans in

Transfers out

Loans out

Friendly matches

Competitions

Overall record

2. Bundesliga

League table

Results summary

Results by round

Matches

DFB-Pokal

Player statistics

Appearances and goals

References

Dynamo Dresden seasons
Dynamo Dresden